The Civil Administration Area of Lorraine (CdZ=Chef der Zivilverwaltung) was an administrative division of the Gau Westmark from 1940 to 1945.

History 
After the outbreak of the Second World War and the defeat of France in 1940, the département of Moselle, renamed "CdZ-Gebiet Lothringen", was added to the Gau Westmark on 30 November 1940. In Nazi Germany, a "CdZ-Gebiet" was the name for a new German territory, under civil administration. This territory was under the authority of Josef Bürckel, Reichskommissar and Gauleiter.

The "CdZ-Gebiet Lothringen" was in the southern part of Gau Westmark. It corresponds exactly to the current département of Moselle. The capital of CdZ-Gebiet Lothringen was Metz. It comprised the subdistricts ("Kreise") of :

 Boulay, ("Landkreis Bolchen") ;
 Château-Salins, ("Landkreis Salzburgen") ;
 Forbach, ("Landkreis Forbach") ;
 Metz, ("Landkreis Metz") ;
 Metz, ("Stadtkreis Metz") ;
 Sarrebourg, ("Landkreis Saarburg") ;
 Sarreguemines, ("Landkreis Saargemünd") ;
 Saint-Avold, ("Landkreis Sankt Avold") ;
 Thionville, ("Landkreis Diedenhofen-Ost") ;
 Thionville, ("Landkreis Diedenhofen-West") ;

References

Sources 
 Territoriale Veränderungen in Deutschland und deutsch verwalteten Gebieten 1874 - 1945 on territorial.de

History of Lorraine
1940 establishments in Germany
1945 disestablishments in Germany